Hisense Group is a Chinese multinational major appliance and electronics manufacturer headquartered in Qingdao, Shandong Province, China. Televisions are the main products of Hisense, and it is the largest TV manufacturer in China by market share since 2004. Hisense is also an OEM, so some of its products are sold to other companies and carry brand names not related to Hisense.

Two major subsidiaries of Hisense Group are listed companies, Hisense Visual Technology and Hisense H.A.(). Both had a state ownership of over 30% via Hisense holding company before the end of 2020.

Hisense Group has over 80,000 employees worldwide, as well as 14 industrial parks, some of which are located in Qingdao, Shunde, Huzhou, Czech Republic, South Africa and Mexico. There are also 18 R&D centers located in Qingdao, Shenzhen, the United States, Germany, Slovenia, Israel, and other countries.

History
Qingdao No.2 Radio Factory, the predecessor of Hisense Group, was established in September 1969; this is the year its existence was first officially recognized. The small factory's first product was a radio sold under the brand name Red Lantern, but the company later gained the know-how to make TVs through a trial-production of black and white televisions ordered by the Shandong National Defense Office. This involved the technical training of three employees at another Chinese factory, Tianjin 712, and resulted in the production of 82 televisions by 1971 and the development of transistor TVs by 1975. Their first TV model, CJD18, was produced in 1978.

Television production in China was limited until 1979, when a meeting of the Ministry of Electronics in Beijing concluded with calls for greater development of the civil-use electronics industry. Qingdao No.2 Radio Factory was then quickly merged with other local electronics makers and manufactured televisions under the name Qingdao General Television Factory in Shandong province.

Color televisions were manufactured through the purchase of a production line from Matsushita, the first of many such technology transfers from foreign firms Hisense has made in order to remain competitive. The companies it has bought from include Hitachi, Lucent, Matsushita, NEC, Sanyo, Toshiba, and Qualcomm.

The Hisense Group emerged in 1994 from a tumult started in 1992 by then-president Zhou Houjian or perhaps even by Li Dezhen, director of the Electronic Instrument Bureau of Qingdao. The Hisense Electrical Appliance Share Holding Company (now, Hisense Electrical Co Ltd) was publicly listed on the Shanghai Stock Exchange in April 1997. Increased competition and price wars in the Chinese electronics market in the 1990s were a boon to Hisense, which gained ten failing enterprises by 1998.

Eager to expand beyond consumer electronics, Hisense Group aimed to become a regional leader in household appliances, computers and communications as well. This strategy prompted great outlays of capital on R&D and on the creation of industrial parks, etc.

In 2013, Hisense invented a type of transparent 3D television.

In July 2015, Hisense bought a Mexico facility from Sharp for $23.7 million alongside rights to use the Sharp brand on televisions sold in North and South America.

In November 2017, Hisense announced it would gain a 95% controlling stake in Toshiba Visual Solutions for US$113 million. In 2018, Hisense became the majority shareholder in Slovenian appliance manufacturer Gorenje with 95.4% of shares.

In 2020, it introduced the world's first true 8K 10 bit HDR screen TV that is based on an AI-powered HDR algorithm and an image quality engine claiming 6.5T supercomputing power.

In May 2022, Hisense announced the launch of the company’s first 4K Fire TV. The TV has a 50-inch 60Hz display with a bezel-less design. It uses Hisense’s ULED technology and comes with support for Dolby vision HDR with Fire TV built in.

Products and services

Hisense manufactures white goods, televisions, set-top boxes, digital TV broadcasting equipment, laptops, mobile phones, wireless modules, wireless PC cards and optical components for the telecommunications and data communications industries.

Hisense retails products under several brand names, including Hisense, Toshiba, Gorenje, Sharp, Kelon, Hitachi, Asko and Ronshen.

Brands
Hisense sells under multiple brand names.

Fridgemaster: a British fridge brand gained in 2012.
Gorenje: Acquired 100% of shares in 2019 of the Slovenian Gorenje.
 Combine: Affixed to no frills air conditioners and refrigerators, Combine-branded products may be purchased by Chinese farmers.
Hisense-Hitachi: A brand of commercial air-conditioners designed and manufactured by a joint venture of Hisense and Hitachi.
Hisense Kelon: A high-end brand under Hisense can be found on refrigerators and air-conditioners.
Ronshen: High quality, middle-end air conditioners and refrigerators retail under this brand name.
Savor: A home appliance brand, from the eponymous Modern English word.
Toshiba: On 15 November 2017, Hisense reached a $114 million deal to acquire a 95% stake of Toshiba Visual Solutions.

Sharp
In 2015, Hisense received a five-year license to use the Sharp brand on televisions in the Americas. Hisense also bought a Sharp factory in Mexico.

In June 2017, Hisense was sued by Sharp under its new owner Foxconn, seeking to have the license agreement halted. Sharp accused Hisense of damaging its brand equity by utilizing its trademarks on products it deemed to be "shoddily manufactured", including those that it believed to have violated U.S. safety standards for electromagnetic radiation, and deceptive advertising of their quality. Hisense denied it engaged in these practices, and stated that it planned to defend itself in court and "will continue to manufacture and sell quality televisions under the Sharp licensed brands."

In February 2018, Sharp dropped the lawsuit.

Operations

Subsidiaries

Hisense owns over 40 subsidiaries, both inside and outside China. A list is available here.

Hisense and Hitachi established Hisense-Hitachi Air-conditioning System Co Ltd in 2003. It designs, manufactures and markets its products, which include commercial and household central air-conditioning systems, in China. They sell Hisense-Hitachi products in Japan. It operates a commercial air-con production facility in the Hisense Information Industrial Park.

Hisense Air Conditioning Co Ltd is a subsidiary set up in the Hisense Pingdu Home Appliance Industrial Park in Pingdu, China, in 1996 to produce air-conditioners using frequency conversion air-conditioner technology purchased from Sanyo.

Hisense Australia Pty Ltd is headquartered in Qingdao, China. Hisense's Australian subsidiary helps distribute Hisense products.

Hisense (Beijing) Electric Co Ltd took over a modern refrigerator factory near Beijing with the help of the local government after Whirlpool withdrew from the project in 1998. Hisense (Beijing) Electric Co Ltd is now responsible for R&D, production and marketing of refrigerators.

Hisense-Whirlpool (Zhejiang) Electric Appliances Co Ltd is a joint venture between Hisense Kelon and Whirlpool formed in 2008 for the development and production of washing machines and refrigerators, Hisense provides this joint venture with refrigerator know-how and Whirlpool, its washing machine manufacturing expertise. The company operates a plant in Huzhou,  Zhejiang province, which manufactures washing machines and large capacity refrigerators.

They created Hisense Export & Import Co Ltd in 1991, this subsidiary is tasked with establishing OEM contracts with foreign companies.

Hisense Hungary Kft is a failed subsidiary established in 2004 as a joint venture with Flextronics. It was in Sárvár, Vas County, Hungary. Hisense Hungary Kft assembled TVs.

Initially, few of the products it manufactured sold under the Hisense brand name, and they focused on OEM products instead. As of 2009, the television plant has been shut down because of falling orders, and Hisense Hungary Kft operates with a staff of 13.

In 2001, Hisense (Shandong) Information Technology Co Ltd created a subsidiary in Jinan, Shandong province, and this subsidiary handles infrastructure-use IT. It develops and markets security technology and intelligent traffic control products and their software.

Hisense Kelon Electrical Holdings Ltd is listed on two stock exchanges. Hisense Kelon is a large Hisense subsidiary.

Hisense Intelligent Commercial Equipment Co Ltd was founded in 1989, this subsidiary manufactures, designs, markets and services POS terminal, electronic cash registers and other specialized peripheral equipment for retailing, tax monitoring and finance. It is also responsible for R&D and manufactures at the Hisense Yellow Island Information Product Manufacturing Park.

Hisense Mobile Communications Technology Co Ltd was created in 2005. Hisense Mobile Communications Technology Co Ltd has its roots in the Hisense Mobile Communications Research Institute, an R&D team created in 2000. Holding 233 patents, 64 inventions and 116 software copyrights, its products include mobile handsets, Linux OS smart phones, wireless modules, PC cards and industry customized terminals.

The government of Qingdao erased Hisense Optics Co Ltd's debts and gave its assets to the Hisense Group in 1995.  This subsidiary operates a remote control factory, a degaussing coil factory and an accessory parts factory. Products manufactured include remote controls, degaussing coils and injection molded parts. It may also produce or produced optical instruments, cameras and telephones. It operates an injection molding workshop in Nancun town, Qingdao.

Hisense Optoelectronics Technology Co Ltd was created as a joint venture between Hisense, Ligent Photonics Inc, et al. in 2003, this subsidiary develops fiber optic products. Its R&D facilities are in Chicago and Qingdao, and it has a production base in the latter location. It is also responsible for marketing Ligent Photonics Inc products in Asia.

Hisense South Africa Development Enterprise Pty Ltd is the company's first overseas subsidiary. This failed joint venture with South African bank NED had a factory in South Africa that manufactured televisions and home-theater equipment. It may still be responsible for R&D and distribution to local retail outlets.

Hisense USA Co is a Georgia-based subsidiary responsible for some activities in the US. Hisense USA may distribute products to retailers or establish an R&D center. Founded in 2000 or 2001, it was initially headquartered in Los Angeles. It may initially have included an R&D facility. As of 2009, it has locations in Gwinnett, Suwanee, and unincorporated Gwinnett County, Georgia.

Hisense and Ligent Photonics Inc. established a joint venture in 2002. This subsidiary designs, develops and fabricates optical components for the telecommunications and data communications industries. Products are designed at its St Charles, Illinois headquarters and manufactured in China. This joint venture sells in North America, Europe and the Middle East through a network of sales representatives and in Asia through Hisense Optoelectronics.

Qingdao Hisense Communications Co Ltd is a subsidiary manufactures mobile phones and operates an R&D facility. Established in 2001, it has a technical cooperation effort with Qualcomm and operates a mobile phone production base in a Hisense IT Industrial Park 90 minutes from Qingdao. One of its products, the Hisense C108, is the first mobile phone to use Qualcomm's biomimetic screen technology, Mirasol, which allows it to be easily read in direct sunlight.

Qingdao Hisense Network Technology Co Ltd was established in 2004. This subsidiary grew out of an internal Hisense department, the Information Technology Center, and provides IT consultancy services.

Qingdao Hisense Property Management Co Ltd provides property management services, as well as product design, mold design, pattern making and mold processing and manufacturing, through this subsidiary.

Qingdao Hisense Real Estate Co Ltd was created in 1995. This subsidiary has over 40 completed developments in Shandong province, including residential buildings, apartments, villas, townhouses, office buildings and large industrial parks.

Qingdao Hisense TransTech Co Ltd was founded in October 1998, this subsidiary manufactures and markets electronics for urban traffic, public transport and logistics. Its products include traffic light control systems, traffic signal controllers, comprehensive public security and traffic information platforms, digital traffic violation video processing systems, public transport dispatch systems, the Hisense intelligent vehicular terminal, the Hisense mobile audio-visual intelligent vehicular terminal and electronic stop signs. Its products are marketed under the HiCon, HiECS, HiATMP, and HiDVS brand names.

As of 2005, Hisense Italy, Hisense's Italian office, may manage own-brand (as opposed to OEM) sales .

Wuhu Ecan Motors Co Ltd is a joint venture between Guangdong Kelon (Rongsheng) Co Ltd, Xiwenjin Co Ltd and Luminous Industrial Ltd. This company produces electric motors for the information industry and for office automation. It is in the Wuhu National High-tech and Industry Development Zone.

Production bases
Hisense owns at least 14 manufacturing parks worldwide and operates several production bases.

Hisense Guangdong Multimedia Industrial Base was put into operation on 28 September 2007. This industrial base produces flat panel TVs and is in the Shunde District of the city of Foshan, Guangdong.

Hisense Industrial Park in South Africa is a Hisense South African production base will manufacture televisions and white goods.

Hisense Information Industrial Park was created in 2001 and in Qingdao, Shandong, this industrial park is on 80 hectares of land. Hisense-Hitachi operates a commercial air-conditioning manufacturing facility in the park and from 2007 a LCD TV module production line also calls the park home.

Hisense Pingdu Home Appliance Industrial Park was in Pingdu, Shandong, it is home to Hisense Air Conditioning Co Ltd.

Huzhou production base is a Hisense inverter-type/variable-frequency air-conditioner production base is in Huzhou, Zhejiang, and was set up on 8 May 2005. A joint venture between Hisense Air Conditioner Co Ltd and Zhejiang Xianke Air Conditioner Co, it is operated by subsidiary Hisense (Zhejiang) Air Conditioner Co Ltd and comprises a 60,000 square meter factory and over 200 mu of land.

Hisense Whirlpool (Huzhou) Household Appliances Industrial Park is a production base that manufactures washing machines and refrigerators for a joint venture with Whirlpool is at this Huzhou park. It comprises an 80,000 square meter factory on 20 hectares of land.

Nanjing Refrigerator Industrial Park is in the Nanjing Xingang Economic and Technological Development Zone of Nanjing, Jiangsu. A refrigerator production base is in this industrial park. The site's factory is 52,000 square meters in size.

Sichuan production base is a Hisense Kelon refrigerator production base with a 36,000 square meter factory is in Chengdu, Sichuan.

Sponsorships

In July 2008, Hisense agreed with Melbourne & Olympic Parks, allowing them six-year naming rights to Hisense Arena, a Melbourne venue for spectator sports such as basketball, netball, dance sports, cycling, gymnastics and tennis. It is the first stadium in the world to be named after a Chinese company. By 2018, the arena had been renamed Melbourne Arena.

In China, Hisense has begun a relationship with the Beihang University (Beijing University of Aeronautics and Astronautics) to set up an engineering postgraduate program approved by the Ministry of Education and a collaboration with Peking University to set up an MBA remote education program.

Hisense was the main sponsor of the UEFA Euro 2016.

Hisense has announced its global partnership deal with the Union of European Football Associations (UEFA) for Men's National Team Football competitions ahead of the UEFA Euro 2020.

Hisense has become an official sponsor of the FIFA World Cup, starting in the 2018 tournament in Russia and continuing to the next tournament in Qatar. Hisense also engages in various global marketing and advertising activities for both the 2017 FIFA Confederations Cup and the 2018 FIFA World Cup.

On 27 July 2017, Hisense and Aston Villa F.C. announced a strategic partnership.

In March 2020, Hisense announced they had entered a three-year agreement to be a major sponsor of the NRL, in a deal than spans the NRL Telstra Premiership, State of Origin and NRL TV. Hisense has also been given the naming rights to Thursday Night Football as part of the agreement.

Notes

References

External links
Hisense  
Hisense Europe 

 
Electronics companies established in 1969
Electronics companies of China
Government-owned companies of China
Chinese companies established in 1969
1997 initial public offerings
Companies listed on the Shanghai Stock Exchange
Consumer electronics brands
Display technology companies
Mobile phone manufacturers
Mobile phone companies of China
Point of sale companies
Heating, ventilation, and air conditioning companies
Home appliance brands
Home appliance manufacturers of China
Multinational companies headquartered in China
Chinese brands
Video equipment manufacturers
Electric motor manufacturers
Pump manufacturers
Engine manufacturers of China